The 2021 National Rugby League finals series was a tournament staged to determine the winner of the 2021 Telstra Premiership season. The series was played over four weekends in September and October, culminating in the 2021 NRL Grand Final on 3 October 2021. Due to the effects of the COVID-19 pandemic in New South Wales the grand final was played outside of Sydney for the first time in competition history, at Brisbane's Suncorp Stadium.

The top eight teams from the 2021 NRL season qualified for the finals series. NRL finals series have been played under the current format since 2012.

Qualification

Venues 
As a result of the 2021 NRL season's relocation to Queensland due to the COVID-19 pandemic in New South Wales and Victoria, all the finals matches were hosted in Queensland with stadiums at full capacity, with the only exception being the grand final at 75% capacity as a result of local COVID-19 cases and Queensland Government restrictions. This saw Rockhampton and Mackay host their first finals matches, whilst Queensland Country Bank Stadium also played host to their first finals at the venue.

Finals structure 

The system used for the 2021 NRL finals series is a final eight system. The top four teams in the eight receive the "double chance" when they play in week-one qualifying finals, such that if a top-four team loses in the first week it still remains in the finals, playing a semi-final the next week against the winner of an elimination final. The bottom four of the eight play knock-out games – only the winners survive and move on to the next week. Home ground advantage goes to the team with the higher ladder position in the first two weeks and to the qualifying final winners in the third week.

In the second week, the winners of the qualifying finals receive a bye to the third week. The losers of the qualifying final plays the elimination finals winners in a semi-final. In the third week, the winners of the semi-finals from week two play the winners of the qualifying finals in the first week. The winners of those matches move on to the Grand Final.

Bracket

Summary

Qualifying & Elimination Finals

1st Qualifying Final (Melbourne v Manly Warringah) 

The First Qualifying Final saw the 1st placed Melbourne Storm against the 4th placed Manly Warringah Sea Eagles. This was the fifth finals meeting between these clubs and the first since the 2012 Preliminary Final.

1st Elimination Final (Sydney v Gold Coast) 
The First Elimination Final saw the 5th placed Sydney Roosters against the 8th placed Gold Coast Titans. This was the second finals meeting between these clubs after meeting in the 2010 Preliminary Final.

2nd Qualifying Final (Penrith v South Sydney) 
The Second Qualifying Final saw the 2nd placed Penrith Panthers against the 3rd placed South Sydney Rabbitohs. This was the second finals meeting between these clubs and a rematch of the 2020 Preliminary Final.

2nd Elimination Final (Parramatta v Newcastle) 
The Second Elimination Final saw the 6th placed Parramatta Eels against the 7th placed Newcastle Knights. This was the fourth finals meeting between these clubs and the first since the 2001 Grand Final.

Semi-finals

1st Semi-Final (Manly Warringah v Sydney) 

The First Semi-Final saw the loser of the First Qualifying Final, the Manly Warringah Sea Eagles against the winner of the First Elimination Final, the Sydney Roosters. This was the ninth finals meeting between the clubs and the first since the 2013 Grand Final.

2nd Semi-Final (Penrith v Parramatta) 
The Second Semi-Final saw the loser of the Second Qualifying Final, the Penrith Panthers against the winner of the Second Elimination Final, the Parramatta Eels. This was the third finals meeting between the clubs and the first since the 2000 Semi-Final.

Preliminary Finals

2nd Preliminary Final (South Sydney v Manly Warringah) 
The Second Preliminary Final saw the winner of the Second Qualifying Final, the South Sydney Rabbitohs against the winner of the First Semi-Final, the Manly Warringah Sea Eagles. This was the fourteenth finals meeting between these clubs and the first since the 2019 Semi-Final.

1st Preliminary Final (Melbourne v Penrith) 
The First Preliminary Final saw the winner of the First Qualifying Final, the Melbourne Storm against the winner of the Second Semi-Final, the Penrith Panthers. This was the second finals meeting between these clubs and a rematch of the 2020 Grand Final.

Grand Final 
The Grand Final saw the winner of the First Preliminary Final, the Penrith Panthers, against the winner of the Second Preliminary Final, the South Sydney Rabbitohs. This was the third finals meeting between the two sides, after the 2021 Qualifying Final, and the first Grand Final played between the teams.

References

2021 NRL season
2021 in Australian rugby league